The 2019–20 season was FCSB's 72nd season since its founding in 1947.

Previous season positions

Season overview

June
On 5 June, FCSB has appointed Bogdan Andone as the new Head Coach of the team. He was presented in a press conference alongside the owner of the club, Gigi Becali and the Sports Director, Mihai Stoica. On the same day, FCSB announced that the club had reached an agreement with Florentin Matei for the termination of his contract.

On 22 June, FCSB defeated Colțea Brașov 7–0 in a pre-season friendly. Oaidă, the most recent transfer, debuted in the friendly match and scored the first goal for the Roș-albaștrii.

On 25 June, FCSB defeated SR Brașov 0–4 in a pre-season friendly. Planić opened the goal series in the 4th minute, Tănase notched two goals in front of over 4,000 fans.

On 28 June, FCSB drew Viitorul Constanța 3–3 in a pre-season friendly in Brașov. Hora netted a spectacular goal in the top corner in the first half, while Oaidă scored twice in the second part of the game.

On 30 June, FCSB and Lecce reached an agreement for the transfer of Romario Benzar to the Italian club for a fee of €2 million.

July
On 1 July, FCSB announced that Filipe Teixeira's contract expired; he was not resigned and was therefore released. In addition to this, it was announced that youngsters Gabriel Simion and Ianis Stoica have been loaned to Astra Giurgiu, respectively Petrolul Ploiești for the 2019–2020 season.

On 2 July, the club cancelled the contract of Adrian Stoian.

On 4 July, FCSB defeated CS Mioveni 0–1 in a pre-season friendly. Tănase scored in the 57th minute from the penalty spot.

On 5 July, FCSB and Gazişehir Gaziantep reached an agreement for the transfer of Júnior Morais to the Turkish club for a fee of €600,000.

On 11 July, FCSB announced that they have reached an agreement with Viitorul Constanța for the transfer of Ionuț Vînă for €750,000 plus a 10% percentage of any future transfer fee. The player signed a five-year contract and his buyout clause was set at €20 million.

On the same day, FCSB defeated Milsami Orhei 2–0 in their first official and Europa League game of the season. Tănase notched two goals. Additionally, in this match, the team also presented their new official Nike home kit for the next two seasons.

On 14 July, FCSB defeated Hermannstadt 4–3 in the first league match of the season. Coman, Hora, Man and Nedelcu scored one goal each in the spectacular win. The match also saw an official debut from Vînă.

On 15 July, the club announced that they have signed the Portuguese player Thierry Moutinho and was given the number 14 jersey.

On 16 July, FCSB announced that they have signed the Portuguese player Diogo Salomão who had played for the cross-town rivals Dinamo București. He signed for one season and was given the number 24 jersey.

On 18 July, FCSB defeated Milsami Orhei 1–2 in the second leg of the first qualifying round. Dumitru and Oaidă scored for the team. Moreover, that day the owner of the club announced that they had reached an agreement with Academica Clinceni for the transfer of Adrian Șut who will be joining the club from 1 July 2020 for an undisclosed fee.

On 22 July, FCSB drew Sepsi Sfântu Gheorghe 0–0. The match saw an official debut from Salomão.

On 25 July, FCSB defeated Alashkert 0–3. Tănase, Cristea and Coman scored for the win, making the qualification in the third qualifying round of Europa League lighter.

On 29 July, FCSB lost to Botoșani 0–2. It represents the first defeat of the season and the first defeat all-time to Botoșani, after 14 clashes between the clubs.

On 31 July, FCSB announced that they have reached an agreement with Politehnica Iași for the transfer of Ionuț Panțîru for €200,000 plus a 10% percentage of any future transfer fee. The 23 years old defender has signed a 5-year deal and will wear shirt number 3.

On 31 July, the club also announced that they have reached an agreement with Minaur Baia Mare for the transfer of youngster Sorin Șerban for €100,000 plus a 15% percentage of any future transfer fee. The 19 years old defender has signed a 5 years contract and will wear shirt number 22.

August
On 1 August, FCSB announced that they have signed the Polish striker Łukasz Gikiewicz and was given the number 27 jersey. Additionally, on the same day, the club announced that they had reached an agreement with Fitness Coach Marian Lupu for the termination of his contract after two years and a half, due to the large number of injuries during the start of the season.

On 1 August, FCSB lost to Alashkert 2–3, but qualified further due to the first leg's result. Tănase scored in the 10' minute but after Bălașa made a penalty and was sent off in the 27' minute, Alaskert managed to score 3 goals. Coman scored for the safety of qualification in the second half. It represents the second defeat in a row, with poor performances, especially due to the large number of injuries.

On 2 August, FCSB announced that they have reached an agreement with Botoșani for the transfer of Aristidis Soiledis for a fee of €75,000. The player signed for one year and will wear the shirt number 18. Moreover, that day FCSB and the Head Coach Bogdan Andone have reached an agreement to terminate the contract after the poor performances in the last 3 games.

On 4 August, the club announced that they have reached an agreement with Gaz Metan Mediaș for the transfer of right-back Valentin Crețu by triggering his buyout clause of €125,000. The 30 years old defender signed a two-year contract and was given the number 2 jersey.

Players

First team squad

Transfers

In

{{Fb in2 player |tc=ROM |bg=y |type=Transfer |p= |eu=y |nb=ROM |n=27 |pos=MF |age= |fcl=Gaz Metan Mediaș|fcnat=ROU|w=W |f=€600,000  |e=2024|os=fcsb.ro}}

{{Fb in2 player |tc=ROM |bg=y |type=Transfer |p= |eu=y |nb=ROM |n=19 |pos=FW |age= |fcl=Esbjerg|fcnat=DEN|w=W |f=€800,000 |e=2024|os=fcsb.ro}}

Out

Overall transfer activity

Expenditure
Summer:   €2,000,000

Winter:   €1,600,000

Total:    €3,600,000

Income
Summer:   €2,600,000

Winter:   €0

Total:    €2,600,000

Net Totals
Summer:   €600,000

Winter:   €1,600,000

Total:    €1,000,000

Friendly matches

Competitions

Overview

Liga I

Regular season

Table

Results summary

Position by round

Results

Championship round

Table

Championship round results summary

Championship round position by round

Championship Matches

Cupa României

Results

UEFA Europa League

Qualifying rounds

First qualifying round

Second qualifying round

Third qualifying round

Play-off round

Statistics

Appearances and goals
 S

! colspan="13" style="background:#DCDCDC; text-align:center" | Players sent out on loan this season
|-

! colspan="13" style="background:#DCDCDC; text-align:center" | Players transferred out during the season
|-

|}

Squad statistics
{|class="wikitable" style="text-align: center;"
|-
! 
! style="width:70px;"|Liga I
! style="width:70px;"|Cupa României
! style="width:70px;"|Europa League
! style="width:70px;"|Home
! style="width:70px;"|Away
! style="width:70px;"|Total Stats
|-
|align=left|Games played       || 28 || 3 || 8 || 18 || 21 || 39
|-
|align=left|Games won          || 14 || 3 || 4 || 7 || 14 || 21
|-
|align=left|Games drawn        || 6 || 0 || 2 || 4 || 4 || 8
|-
|align=left|Games lost         || 8 || 0 || 2 || 5 || 5 || 10
|-
|align=left|Goals scored       || 43 || 5 || 10 || 25 || 33 || 58
|-
|align=left|Goals conceded     || 32 || 1 || 5 || 21 || 17 || 38
|-
|align=left|Goal difference    || +11 || +4 || +5 || +4 || +16 || +20
|-
|align=left|Clean sheets       || 10 || 2 || 5 || 6 || 11 || 17
|-
|align=left|Goal by Substitute || 7 || 1 || 2 || 5 || 5 || 10
|-
|align=left|Total shots        || 284 || 9 || 76 || 197 || 172 || 369
|-
|align=left|Shots on target    || 139 || 4 || 37 || 100 || 80 || 180
|-
|align=left|Corners            || 144 || 4 || 39 || 94 || 93 || 187
|-
|align=left|Players used       || 38 || 28 || 28 || 38 || 36 || 42
|-
|align=left|Offsides           || 40 || 1 || 19 || 31 || 29 || 60
|-
|align=left|Fouls suffered     || 413 || 25 || 119 || 255 || 302 || 557
|-
|align=left|Fouls committed    || 473 || 14 || 120 || 288 || 319 || 607
|-
|align=left|Yellow cards       || 79 || 7 || 23 || 50 || 59 || 109
|-
|align=left|Red cards          || 6 || 0 || 2 || 2 || 6 || 8
|-
|align=left| Winning rate      || % || % || % || %  || % || %
|-

Goalscorers

Goal minutes

Last updated: 8 March 2020 (UTC) 
Source: FCSB

Hat-tricks

Clean sheets

Disciplinary record

Attendances

1Impact of the COVID-19 pandemic on association football

Awards

UEFA Club rankings
This is the current UEFA Club Rankings, including season 2018–19.

See also

 2019–20 Cupa României
 2019–20 Liga I
 2019–20 UEFA Europa League

Notes and references

FC Steaua București seasons
Steaua
Steaua București